Chris-Ann Onessa Chambers (born October 24, 1995) is a Jamaican footballer who plays as a goalkeeper for University of the West Indies FC and the Jamaica women's national team.

Early life 
During her younger years, Chambers enjoyed track and field, netball and cricket, but her true calling was soccer. She was introduced to her greatest thrill of being competitively involved after she strolled through the gates of Wolmer's Girls School.

International career
Chambers represented Jamaica at two CONCACAF Women's U-17 Championship editions (2010 and 2012).

References

External links

1995 births
Living people
Jamaican women's footballers
Women's association football goalkeepers
Jamaica women's international footballers